Mládek (feminine Mládková) is a Czech surname. Notable people with the surname include:

 Ivan Mládek (born 1942), Czech recording artist, composer, and comedian
 Jan Mládek (born 1960), Czech politician
 Meda Mládková, Czech art collector

Czech-language surnames